Land of the Lost may refer to:
 Land of the Lost (1974 TV series), the original 1974 children's television series
 Land of the Lost (1991 TV series), the 1991 remake of the 1974 series
 Land of the Lost (film), a 2009 Will Ferrell comedy film loosely based on the 1974 series

Music
 Land of the Lost (The Freeze album), 1984
 "Land of the Lost", 1994 single by Cella Dwellas, a hip hop duo
 Land of the Lost (Wipers album), 1986
 "Land of the Lost", a track on the 1998 album, Static, by the Christian rock band Bleach
 "Land of the Lost", a track on the 1999 album, Unforgiven, by the rap singer X-Raided
 "Land of the Lost", a track on the 1999 album, The 3rd Wish, by the rapper South Park Mexican
 "Land of the Lost", a track on the 2000 album, Green Velvet, by the house music artist Curtis Jones
 "Land of the Lost", a track on the 2004 album, The Dr. Steel Collection, by steampunk/dieselpunk/rivethead musician Dr. Steel
 Land of the Lost, a 2008 album by the fusion duo J Davey
 "Land of the Lost", a track on the 2008 album, The Vegas Years, b y the rock band Everclear
'Land of the Lost' a track on the 1994 album, Dreamatorium, by Death Cube K (an anagram for Buckethead)

Other 
 Land of the Lost (radio), the 1944–1948 radio drama by Isabel Manning Hewson
 "Land of the Lost", a 1969 episode of the Land of the Giants TV show
 "Land of the Lost" (Legends of Tomorrow), an episode of Legends of Tomorrow
 The Land of the Lost is the place lost things go in the children's book The Christmas Pig by J. K. Rowling.